Long Island's Nassau and Suffolk counties are home to 125 public school districts, containing a total of 656 public schools.

The list below contains each of Long Island's school districts, along with their respective schools.

A

Amagansett Union Free School District

 Amagansett School

Amityville Union Free School District

 Amityville Memorial High School
 Park Avenue School
 Edmund W. Miles Middle School
 Northeast School
 Northwest Elementary School

B

Babylon Union Free School District

 Babylon Memorial Grade School
 Babylon Junior-Senior High School
 Babylon Elementary School

Baldwin Union Free School District

 Baldwin Middle School
 Brookside Elementary School
 Baldwin Senior High School
 Lenox Elementary School
 Meadow Elementary School
 Milburn Elementary School
 Plaza Elementary School
 Shubert Elementary School
 Steele Elementary School

Bay Shore Union Free School District

 Bay Shore Middle School
 Bay Shore Senior High School
 Brook Avenue Elementary School
 Fifth Avenue School
 Gardiner Manor School
 Mary G. Clarkson School
 South Country School

Bayport-Blue Point Union Free School District

 James Wilson Young Middle School
 Bayport-Blue Point High School
 Academy Street Elementary School
 Blue Point Elementary School
 Sylvan Avenue Elementary School

Bellmore Union Free School District

 Shore Road School
 Reinhard Early Childhood Center
 Winthrop Avenue School

Bellmore-Merrick Central High School District

 Merrick Avenue Middle School
 Grand Avenue Middle School
 John F. Kennedy High School
 Sanford H. Calhoun High School
 Wellington C. Mepham High School

Bethpage Union Free School District

 Bethpage Senior High School
 John F. Kennedy Middle School
 Central Boulevard Elementary School
 Charles Campagne School
 Kramer Lane Elementary School

Brentwood Union Free School District

 North Middle School
 Brentwood High School
 South Middle School
 West Middle School
 East Middle School
 Freshman Center
 East Elementary School
 Hemlock Park Elementary School
 Laurel Park Elementary School
 Loretta Park Elementary School
 North Elementary School
 Northeast Elementary School
 Oak Park Elementary School
 Pine Park Elementary School
 Southeast Elementary School
 Southwest Elementary School
 Twin Pines Elementary School

Bridgehampton Union Free School District

 Bridgehampton School

C

Carle Place Union Free School District

 Carle Place Middle/High School
 Cherry Lane School
 Rushmore Avenue School

Center Moriches Union Free School District

 Center Moriches High School
 Center Moriches Middle School
 Clayton Huey Elementary School

Central Islip Union Free School District

 Cordello Avenue Elementary School
 Central Islip Senior High School
 Andrew T. Morrow School
 Central Islip Early Childhood Center
 Charles A. Mulligan School
 Francis J. O'Neill School
 Marguerite L. Mulvey School
 Ralph Reed School

Cold Spring Harbor Central School District

 Cold Spring Harbor Junior-Senior High School
 Goosehill Primary Center
 Lloyd Harbor School
 West Side School

Commack School District

 Commack Middle School
 Commack High School
 Burr Intermediate School
 Indian Hollow School
 North Ridge School
 Rolling Hills School
 Sawmill Intermediate School
 Wood Park School

Comsewogue Union Free School District

 John F. Kennedy Middle School
 Comsewogue High School
 Norwood Avenue School
 Terryville Road School
 Boyle Road Elementary School
 Clinton Avenue School

Connetquot Central School District

 Helen B. Duffield Elementary School
 Edith L. Slocum Elementary School
 Cherokee Street Elementary School
 Idle Hour Elementary School
 John Pearl Elementary School
 Sycamore Avenue Elementary School
 Bosti Elementary School
 Ronkonkoma Middle School
 Oakdale-Bohemia Middle School
 Connetquot High School
 Arthur Premm Learning Center

Copiague Union Free School District

 Copiague Middle School
 Walter G. O'Connell Copiague High School
 Deauville Gardens Elementary School
 Great Neck Road Elementary School
 Susan E. Wiley School

D

Deer Park Union Free School District

 Deer Park High School
 John Quincy Adams Elementary School
 May Moore Elementary School
 Robert Frost Middle School
 John F. Kennedy Intermediate School

E

East Hampton Union Free School District

 East Hampton Middle School
 East Hampton High School
 John M. Marshall Elementary School

East Islip Union Free School District

 East Islip High School
 Connetquot Elementary School
 Early Childhood Center
 East Islip Middle School
 John F. Kennedy Elementary School
 Ruth C. Kinney Elementary School
 Timber Point Elementary School

East Meadow Union Free School District

 Clarke Middle School
 W. Tresper Clarke High School
 Barnum Woods School
 Bowling Green School
 East Meadow High School
 Mcvey Elementary School
 Meadowbrook Elementary School
 Parkway School
 Woodland Middle School

East Moriches Union Free School District

 East Moriches School
 East Moriches Elementary School

East Quogue Union Free School District

 East Quogue Elementary School

East Rockaway Union Free School District

 Centre Avenue Elementary School
 East Rockaway Junior-Senior High School
 Rhame Avenue Elementary School

East Williston Union Free School District

 North Side Elementary School
 Willets Road Middle School
 The Wheatley School

Eastport-South Manor Central School District

 Eastport-South Manor Junior-Senior High School
 Dayton Avenue School
 Eastport Elementary School
 South Street School

Elmont Union Free School District

 Alden Terrace School
 Clara H. Carlson School
 Covert Avenue School
 Dutch Broadway School
 Gotham Avenue School
 Stewart Manor School

Elwood Union Free School District

 Elwood Middle School
 John Glenn High School
 Harley Avenue Primary School
 James H. Boyd Intermediate School

F

Farmingdale Union Free School District

 Albany Avenue Elementary School
 Farmingdale Senior High School
 Weldon E. Howitt Middle School
 Northside Elementary School
 Saltzman East Memorial Elementary School
 Woodward Parkway Elementary School

Fire Island Union Free School District

 Woodhull School

Fishers Island Union Free School District

 Fishers Island School

Floral Park-Bellerose Union Free School District

 Floral Park-Bellerose School
 John Lewis Childs School

Franklin Square Union Free School District

 John Street School
 Polk Street School
 Washington Street School

Freeport Union Free School District

 Freeport High School
 Bayview Avenue School
 John W. Dodd Middle School
 New Visions Elementary School
 Caroline G. Atkinson School
 Leo F. Giblyn School
 Archer Street School
 Columbus Avenue School

G

Garden City Union Free School District

 Garden City Middle School
 Garden City High School
 Hemlock School
 Homestead School
 Locust School
 Stewart School
 Stratford Avenue School

Glen Cove City School District

 Glen Cove High School
 Glen Cove Finley Middle School
 Gribbin School
 Connolly School
 Deasy School
 Landing School

Great Neck Union Free School District

 Great Neck North Middle School
 Great Neck South Middle School
 Great Neck South High School
 E.M. Baker School
 Great Neck North High School
 John F. Kennedy School
 Lakeville School
 Parkville Pre-K Center
 Saddle Rock School
 Great Neck Village School

Greenport Union Free School District

 Greenport High School
 Greenport Elementary School

H

Half Hollow Hills Central School District

 Candlewood Middle School
 Half Hollow Hills High School East
 Half Hollow Hills High School West
 West Hollow Middle School
 Otsego Elementary School
 Chestnut Hill Elementary School
 Forest Park Elementary School
 Paumanok Elementary School
 Signal Hill Elementary School
 Sunquam Elementary School
 Vanderbilt Elementary

Hampton Bays School District

 Hampton Bays High School
 Hampton Bays Middle School
 Hampton Bays Elementary School

Harborfields Central School District

 Oldfield Middle School
 Thomas J. Lahey Elementary School
 Harborfields High School
 Washington Drive Primary School

Hauppauge Union Free School District

 Hauppauge High School
 Hauppauge Middle School
 Bretton Woods Elementary School
 Forest Brook Elementary School
 Pines Elementary School

Hempstead Union Free School District

 Alverta B. Gray Schultz Middle School
 Barack Obama Elementary School
 Franklin School
 Hempstead High School
 Jackson Annex School
 David Paterson School
 Hempstead Early Childhood Center
 Jackson Main Elementary School
 Marshall School

Herricks Union Free School District

 Herricks High School
 Herricks Middle School
 Center Street School
 Denton Avenue School
 Searingtown School

Hewlett-Woodmere School District

 Woodmere Middle School
 George W. Hewlett High School
 Ogden Elementary School
 Franklin Early Childhood Center
 Hewlett Elementary School

Hicksville Union Free School District

 Hicksville Middle School
 Hicksville High School
 Old Country Road School
 Woodland Avenue School
 Burns Avenue School
 Lee Avenue School
 Dutch Lane School
 East Street School
 Fork Lane School

Huntington Union Free School District

 Huntington High School
 Finley Junior High School
 Woodhull Intermediate School
 Huntington Intermediate School
 Flower Hill School
 Jefferson School
 Southdown School
 Washington School

I

Island Park School District

 Francis X. Hegarty Elementary School
 Island Park Lincoln Orens Middle School

Island Trees Union Free School District

 Island Trees Memorial Middle School
 Island Trees High School
 J. Fred Sparke School
 Michael F. Stokes School

Islip Union Free School District

 Commack Road Elementary School
 Islip High School
 Islip Middle School
 Maud S. Sherwood Elementary School
 Wing Elementary School

J

Jericho Union Free School District 

 Jericho Senior High School
 Jericho Middle School
 Cantiague Elementary School
 Robert Seaman Elementary School
 Jackson Elementary School

K

Kings Park Central School District

 William T. Rogers Middle School
 Kings Park High School
 Parkview Elementary School
 Fort Salonga Elementary School
 R.J.O. Intermediate School

L

Lawrence Union Free School District

 School 2
 School 4
 School 5
 School 6
 Lawrence Middle School
 Lawrence High School

Levittown Union Free School District

 Abbey Lane Elementary
 Division Ave. High School
 East Broadway Elementary
 Gardiners Ave. Elementary
 Jonas E. Salk Middle School
 Lee Road Elementary
 MacArthur High School
 Northside Elementary
 Summit Lane Elementary
 Wisdom Lane Middle School

Lindenhurst Union Free School District

 Lindenhurst Middle School
 Lindenhurst Senior High School
 Albany Avenue School
 Alleghany Avenue School
 Daniel Street School
 Harding Avenue School
 West Gates Avenue School
 William Rall School
 Bower School

Little Flower Union Free School District

 Little Flower School

Locust Valley Central School District

 Locust Valley Middle School
 Locust Valley High School
 Bayville Elementary School
 Locust Valley Elementary School
 Ann P. MacArthur Elementary School

Long Beach City School District

 West Elementary School
 Blackheath Road Pre-Kindergarten Center
 East Elementary School
 Lido Elementary School
 Lindell Boulevard School
 Long Beach Middle School
 Long Beach City High School
 NIKE Work Based Learning Center

Longwood Central School District

 Charles E. Walters School
 Coram Elementary School
 Ridge Elementary School
 West Middle Island School
 Longwood Middle School
 Longwood Junior High School
 Longwood High School

Lynbrook Union Free School District

 Lynbrook North Middle School
 Lynbrook Senior High School
 Lynbrook South Middle School
 Kindergarten Center At Atlantic Avenue
 Marion Street School
 Waverly Park School
 West End School

M

Malverne Union Free School District

 Malverne Senior High School
 Howard T. Herber Middle School
 Davison Avenue Elementary School
 Maurice W. Downing School

Manhasset Union Free School District 

 Munsey Park Elementary School
 Shelter Rock Elementary School
 Manhasset Secondary School

Massapequa Union Free School District

 Birch Lane Elementary
 East Lake Elementary
 Fairfield Elementary
 Lockhart Elementary
 McKenna Elementary
 Unqua Elementary
 Berner Middle School
 Massapequa High School
 Ames Campus

Mattituck-Cutchogue Union Free School District

 Mattituck-Cutchogue Elementary School
 Mattituck Junior-Senior High School

Merrick Union Free School District

 Birch School
 Chatterton School
 Norman J. Levy Lakeside School

Middle Country Central School District

 Bicycle Path Pre-K Center
 Eugene Auer Memorial School
 Hawkins Path School
 Holbrook Road School
 Jericho Elementary School
 New Lane Memorial Elementary School
 North Coleman Road School
 Oxhead Road School
 Stagecoach School
 Unity Drive Pre-K Center
 Selden Middle School
 Dawnwood Middle School
 Centereach High School
 Newfield High School

Miller Place Union Free School District

 Miller Place High School
 North Country Road School
 Andrew Muller Primary School
 Sound Beach School

Mineola Union Free School District

 Mineola Middle School
 Mineola High School
 Cross Street School
 Hampton Street School
 Jackson Avenue School
 Meadow Drive School
 Willis Avenue School

Montauk Union Free School District

 Montauk School

Mount Sinai Union Free School District

 Mount Sinai Elementary School
 Mount Sinai Middle School
 Mount Sinai High School

N

New Hyde Park-Garden City Park Union Free School District

 Garden City Park School
 Hillside Grade School
 Manor Oaks William Bowie School
 New Hyde Park Road School

New Suffolk Common School District

 New Suffolk School

North Babylon Union Free School District

 Woods Road Elementary School
 Belmont Elementary School
 Parliament Place School
 Marion G. Vedder Elementary School
 Willam E. DeLuca Elementary School
 Robert Moses Middle School
 North Babylon High School

North Bellmore Union Free School District

 John G. Dinkelmeyer School
 Martin Avenue Elementary School
 Newbridge Road School
 Park Avenue School
 Saw Mill Road School

North Merrick Union Free School District

 Camp Avenue School
 Harold D. Fayette School
 Old Mill Road School

North Shore Central School District

 Glen Head Elementary School
 Glenwood Landing Elementary School
 Sea Cliff Elementary School
 North Shore Middle School
 North Shore Senior High School

Northport-East Northport Union Free School District

 Bellerose Elementary School
 Dickinson Avenue Elementary School
 Fifth Avenue Elementary School
 Norwood Avenue School
 Ocean Avenue School
 Pulaski Road School
 East Northport Middle School
 Northport Middle School
 Northport Senior High School

O

Oceanside School District

 School 2
 School 3
 School 4
 School 5
 School 6-Kindergarten Center
 School 8
 Boardman Elementary School
 Oceanside Middle School
 Oceanside Senior High School

Oyster Bay-East Norwich Central School District

 Theodore Roosevelt School
 Vernon School
 Oyster Bay High School

Oysterponds Union Free School District

 Oysterponds Elementary School

P

Patchogue-Medford Union Free School District

 Patchogue-Medford High School
 Saxton Middle School
 South Ocean Middle School
 Oregon Middle School
 Canaan Elementary School
 Barton Elementary School
 Bay Elementary School
 Eagle Elementary School
 Medford Elementary School
 River Elementary School
 Tremont Elementary School

Plainedge Union Free School District

 Charles E. Schwarting School
 Eastplain School
 John H. West School
 Plainedge Middle School
 Plainedge Senior High School

Plainview-Old Bethpage Central School District

 Plainview-Old Bethpage Kindergarten Center
 Old Bethpage Grade School
 Parkway Elementary School
 Pasadena Elementary School
 Stratford Road Elementary School
 Howard B. Mattlin Middle School
 Plainview-Old Bethpage Middle School
 Plainview-Old Bethpage John F. Kennedy High School

Port Jefferson Union Free School District

 Port Jefferson Middle School
 Earl L. Vandermeulen High School
 Edna Louise Spear Elementary School

Port Washington Union Free School District

 Guggenheim Elementary School
 John J. Daly Elementary School
 John Philip Sousa Elementary School
 Manorhaven Elementary School
 South Salem Elementary School
 Carrie Palmer Weber Middle School
 Paul D. Schreiber Senior High School

Q

Quogue Union Free School District

 Quogue Elementary School

R

Remsenburg-Speonk Union Free School District

 Remsenburg-Speonk Elementary School

Riverhead Central School District

 Pulaski Street Elementary School
 Riverhead Middle School
 Aquebogue Elementary School
 Phillips Avenue School
 Riverhead Senior High School
 Riley Avenue School
 Roanoke Avenue School

Rockville Centre Union Free School District

 William S. Covert Elementary School
 Jennie E. Hewitt Elementary School
 Riverside Elementary School
 Floyd B. Watson Elementary School
 Francis F. Wilson Elementary School
 South Side Middle School
 South Side High School

Rocky Point Union Free School District

 Rocky Point Middle School
 Rocky Point High School
 Joseph A. Edgar Intermediate School
 Frank J. Carasiti Elementary School

Roosevelt Union Free School District

 Roosevelt High School
 Centennial Avenue School
 Ulysses Byas Elementary School
 Roosevelt Middle School
 Washington Rose School

Roslyn Union Free School District

 Heights School
 Harbor Hill Elementary School
 Harbor Hill Elementary School
 Roslyn Middle School
 Roslyn High School

S

Sachem Central School District

 Samoset Middle School
 Seneca Middle School
 Sagamore Middle School
 Sequoya Middle School
 Sachem High School East
 Wenonah School
 Lynwood Avenue School
 Sachem High School North
 Cayuga School
 Chippewa Elementary School
 Gatelot Avenue School
 Grundy Avenue School
 Hiawatha School
 Merrimac School
 Nokomis School
 Tamarac Elementary School
 Tecumseh Elementary School
 Waverly Avenue School

Sag Harbor Union Free School District

 Pierson Middle-High School
 Sag Harbor Elementary School

Sagaponack Common School District

 Sagaponack School

Sayville Union Free School District

 Sayville High School
 Lincoln Avenue Elementary School
 Sayville Middle School
 Cherry Avenue Elementary School
 Sunrise Drive Elementary School

Seaford Union Free School District

 Seaford Middle School
 Seaford High School
 Seaford Harbor School
 Seaford Manor School

Sewanhaka Central High School District
 Elmont Memorial High School
 Floral Park Memorial High School
 Sewanhaka High School
 H. Frank Carey Junior/Senior High School
 New Hyde Park Memorial High School

Shelter Island Union Free School District

 Shelter Island School

Shoreham-Wading River Central School District

 Shoreham-Wading River High School
 Albert G. Prodell Middle School
 Miller Avenue School
 Wading River Elementary School

Smithtown Central School District

 Great Hollow Middle School
 Smithtown High School East
 Smithtown High School West
 Nesaquake Middle School
 Tackan Elementary School
 Accompsett Middle School
 Branch Brook Elementary School
 Dogwood Elementary School
 Mills Pond Elementary School
 Mount Pleasant Elementary School
 Nesconset Elementary School
 Saint James Elementary School
 Smithtown Elementary School
 Accompsett Elementary School

South Country Central School District

 Kreamer Street Elementary School
 Verne W. Critz Elementary School
 Bellport Middle School
 Bellport High School
 Brookhaven Elementary School
 Frank P. Long Intermediate School
 Southaven Academy

South Huntington Union Free School District

 Birchwood Intermediate School
 Countrywood Primary Center
 Silas Wood 6th Grade Center
 Henry L. Stimson Middle School
 Maplewood Intermediate School
 Oakwood Primary Center
 Walt Whitman High School

Southampton Union Free School District

 Southampton Senior High School
 Southampton Intermediate School
 Southampton Elementary School

Southold Union Free School District

 Southold Junior-Senior High School
 Southold Elementary School

Springs Union Free School District

 Springs School

Syosset Central School District

 Harry B. Thompson Middle School
 Syosset High School
 Baylis Elementary School
 Berry Hill Elementary School
 Robbins Lane Elementary School
 South Grove Elementary School
 South Woods Middle School
 Village Elementary School
 Walt Whitman Elementary School
 Willits Elementary School

T

Three Village Central School District

 Ward Melville High School
 Arrowhead Elementary School
 Minnesauke Elementary School
 Nassakeag Elementary School
 Paul J. Gelinas Junior High School
 Robert Cushman Murphy Junior High School
 Setauket Elementary School
 William Sidney Mount School

Tuckahoe Common School District

 Tuckahoe School

U

Uniondale Union Free School District

 California Avenue Elementary School
 Grand Avenue Elementary School
 Smith Street Elementary School
 Walnut Street Elementary School
 Lawrence Road Middle School
 Northern Parkway Elementary School
 Turtle Hook Middle School
 Uniondale High School

V

Valley Stream 13 Union Free School District

 Howell Road School
 James A. Dever School
 Wheeler Avenue School
 Willow Road School

Valley Stream 24 Union Free School District

 Brooklyn Avenue School
 William L. Buck School
 Robert W. Carbonaro School

Valley Stream 30 Union Free School District

 Clearstream Avenue School
 Forest Road School
 Shaw Avenue School

Valley Stream Central High School District

 Valley Stream Central High School
 Valley Stream Memorial Junior High School
 Valley Stream North High School
 Valley Stream South High School

W

Wainscott Common School District

 Wainscott School

Wantagh Union Free School District

 Wantagh Senior High School
 Forest Lake School
 Mandalay School
 Wantagh Middle School
 Wantagh Elementary School

West Babylon Union Free School District

 West Babylon Senior High School
 Santapogue School
 Forest Avenue School
 John F. Kennedy School
 South Bay School
 Tooker Avenue School
 West Babylon Junior High School

West Hempstead Union Free School District

 Cornwell Avenue School
 West Hempstead High School
 George Washington School
 Chestnut Street School
 West Hempstead Middle School

West Islip Union Free School District

 Bayview Elementary School
 Oquenock Elementary School
 Udall Road Middle School
 Beach Street Middle School
 Manetuck Elementary School
 Paul J. Bellew Elementary School
 West Islip High School

Westbury Union Free School District

 Westbury Middle School
 Drexel Avenue School
 Westbury High School
 Dryden Street School
 Park Avenue School
 Powells Lane School

Westhampton Beach Union Free School District

 Westhampton Middle School
 Westhampton Beach Elementary School
 Westhampton Beach Senior High School

William Floyd School District

 Tangier Elementary School
 Woodhull Elementary School
 William Floyd Elementary School
 William Paca Middle School
 William Floyd High School

Wyandanch Union Free School District

 Milton L. Olive Middle School
 Wyandanch Memorial High School
 Martin Luther King Elementary School

References

Education in Nassau County, New York
Education in Suffolk County, New York
Schools